Adam Williams (born Adam William Berg, November 26, 1922 – December 4, 2006) was an American film and television actor.

Life and career
Born Adam William Berg in Wall Lake, Iowa, and raised in New York City. A veteran "bad guy" actor of 1950s film and TV, he began his career after distinguished World War II military service as a United States Navy pilot, for which he received the Navy Cross.

In 1952, Williams played the lead, as a Los Angeles woman killer, in the film Without Warning! In 1953, he was cast as Larry, a car bomber, in The Big Heat. He had a leading role in the 1958 science fiction movie The Space Children. Other notable film roles include the psychiatrist in Fear Strikes Out (1957) and Valerian in Alfred Hitchcock's North by Northwest (1959) with Cary Grant and James Mason.

An accomplished pilot, Williams also worked as an accident examiner for the FAA.

During the 1950s and 1960s, he appeared on dozens of television series, including the syndicated The Sheriff of Cochise, set in Arizona and starring John Bromfield, and Have Gun – Will Travel in the episode "The Reasonable Man". He portrayed private detective and murderer Jason Beckmeyer in the 1957 Perry Mason episode "The Case of the Runaway Corpse." In 1961, he was cast as Jim Gates in the episode "Frontier Week" on Joanne Dru's sitcom Guestward, Ho!, set on a dude ranch in New Mexico. In 1960, he played the role of a sailor hitching a ride in The Twilight Zone season 1 episode "The Hitch-Hiker", where he is picked up by a terrified driver played by Inger Stevens, who is compelled to pick him up so that he may offer protection and safety to her from a mysterious hitchhiker who shows up at various times and places along the road while she travels across country. Many reviewers have cited this episode as one of The Twilight Zones "10 Greatest" of the series. He had also appeared in the Twilight Zone episode "A Most Unusual Camera".

Between 1959 and 1967 he appeared in six episodes of The Rifleman and in four episodes of Bonanza, and in 1961 as Adam in "A Rope for Charlie Munday", in the ABC adventure series The Islanders. He was cast as Burley Keller in the 1961 episode "The Persecuted" of the ABC/Warner Brothers western series Lawman. He guest-starred in an episode of the 1961 NBC series The Americans, based on family conflicts stemming from the American Civil War, and in an episode of the 1961 series The Asphalt Jungle. One of his later roles was in the 1976 television movie Helter Skelter.

Death
On December 4, 2006, Williams died in Los Angeles of lymphoma at the age of 84. He was cremated.

Filmography

Queen for a Day (1951) - Chuck, High Diver segment
Flying Leathernecks (1951) - Lt. Bert Malotke
Without Warning! (1952) - Carl Martin
Vice Squad (1953) - Marty Kusalich
The Big Heat (1953) - Larry Gordon
Dragonfly Squadron (1954) - Capt. Wyler
The Yellow Tomahawk (1954) - Cpl. Maddock
Crashout (1955) - Fred Summerfield
The Sea Chase (1955) - Kruger - Wireless Operator (uncredited)
The Proud and Profane (1956) - Eustace Press
The Rack (1956) - Sgt. Otto Pahnke
Fear Strikes Out (1957) - Dr. Brown
The Garment Jungle (1957) - Ox
The Oklahoman (1957) - Bob Randell
The Lonely Man (1957) - Lon
Darby's Rangers (1958) - Heavy Hall
The Space Children (1958) - Dave Brewster
The Badlanders (1958) - Leslie
North by Northwest (1959) - Valerian
The Last Sunset (1961) - Calverton
Convicts 4 (1962) - Guard #1
Gunfight at Comanche Creek (1963) - Jed Hayden
The New Interns (1964) - Wolanski
The Glory Guys (1965) - Pvt. Lucas Crain
Follow Me, Boys! (1966) - Sergeant (uncredited)
The Horse in the Gray Flannel Suit (1968) - Sergeant Roberts
This Is a Hijack (1973) - Smitty

Further reading

References

External links
 
 

1922 births
2006 deaths
American male film actors
American male television actors
Recipients of the Navy Cross (United States)
Male actors from Los Angeles
Deaths from cancer in California
Deaths from lymphoma
20th-century American male actors
Western (genre) television actors
Jewish American male actors
United States Navy pilots of World War II
20th-century American Jews
21st-century American Jews